Jonh Brandoon González Cigarroa (born August 30, 1996, in Tapachula, Chiapas) is a Mexican professional footballer who last played as a midfielder for Ocelotes UNACH.

External links
 
 

Living people
1996 births
People from Tapachula
Footballers from Chiapas
Mexican footballers
Association football midfielders
Liga MX players
Liga Premier de México players
Club América footballers
Ocelotes UNACH footballers